Fellows of the Royal Society elected in 1994.

Fellows

David John Aldous
Raymond Baker
Nicholas Hamilton Barton
Timothy Vivian Pelham Bliss
Richard Ewen Borcherds
Geoffrey Allan Boxshall
Jeremy Patrick Brockes
Anthony Edward Butterworth
Henry Marshall Charlton
Anthony Kevin Cheetham
Julian Edmund Davies
Nicholas Barry Davies
George Guy Dodson  (1937-2012)
George Petros Efstathiou
John Edwin Field
Graham Richard Fleming
Michael John Caldwell Gordon
Dennis Greenland  (1930-2012)
Kurt Lambeck
Brian Edward Launder
Andrew Gino Sita Lumsden
David Herman MacLennan
Tak Wah Mak
Peter McCullagh
Dusa McDuff
Robert Michael Moor
 Sir Peter John Morris
John Forster Nixon
Andrew Clennel Palmer
David Godfrey Pettifor
Anthony James Pawson  (1952–2013)
Brian Kidd Ridley
Derek Charles Robinson  (1941-2002)
David Sherrington
 Sir James Fraser Stoddart
John Tooze
Richard Treisman
Scott Duncan Tremaine
Robert Stephen White
James Gordon Williams

Foreign members

Frank Albert Cotton  (1930-2007)
Friedrich Ernst Peter Hirzebruch  (1927–2012)
Isaak Markovich Khalatnikov
Hugh O'Neill McDevitt
Erwin Neher
Bert Sakmann

References

1994 in science
1994
1994 in the United Kingdom